The infinity symbol is a mathematical symbol representing the concept of infinity. This symbol is also called a lemniscate, after the lemniscate curves of a similar shape studied in algebraic geometry, or "lazy eight", in the terminology of livestock branding.

This symbol was first used mathematically by John Wallis in the 17th century, although it has a longer history of other uses. In mathematics, it often refers to infinite processes (potential infinity) rather than infinite values (actual infinity). It has other related technical meanings, such as the use of long-lasting paper in bookbinding, and has been used for its symbolic value of the infinite in modern mysticism and literature. It is a common element of graphic design, for instance in corporate logos as well as in older designs such as the Métis flag.

Both the infinity symbol itself and several variations of the symbol are available in various character encodings.

History

The lemniscate has been a common decorative motif since ancient times; for instance it is commonly seen on Viking Age combs.

The English mathematician John Wallis is credited with introducing the infinity symbol with its mathematical meaning in 1655, in his De sectionibus conicis. Wallis did not explain his choice of this symbol. It has been conjectured to be a variant form of a Roman numeral, but which Roman numeral is unclear. One theory proposes that the infinity symbol was based on the numeral for 100 million, which resembled the same symbol enclosed within a rectangular frame. Another proposes instead that it was based on the notation CIↃ used to represent 1,000. Instead of a Roman numeral, it may alternatively be derived from a variant  the lower-case form of omega, the last letter in the Greek alphabet.

Perhaps in some cases because of typographic limitations, other symbols resembling the infinity sign have been used for the same meaning. Leonhard Euler used an open letterform more closely resembling a reflected and sideways S than a lemniscate, and even "O–O" has been used as a stand-in for the infinity symbol itself.

Usage

Mathematics
In mathematics, the infinity symbol is used more often to represent a potential infinity, rather than an actually infinite quantity as included in the extended real numbers, the cardinal numbers and the ordinal numbers (which use other notations, such as and ω, for infinite values). For instance, in mathematical expressions with summations and limits such as 

the infinity sign is conventionally interpreted as meaning that the variable grows arbitrarily large towards infinity, rather than actually taking an infinite value, although other interpretations are possible.

The infinity symbol may also be used to represent a point at infinity, especially when there is only one such point under consideration. This usage includes, in particular, the infinite point of a projective line, and the point added to a topological space to form its one-point compactification.

Other technical uses

In areas other than mathematics, the infinity symbol may take on other related meanings. For instance, it has been used in bookbinding to indicate that a book is printed on acid-free paper and will therefore be long-lasting. On cameras and their lenses, the infinity symbol indicates that the lens's focal length is set to an infinite distance, and is "probably one of the oldest symbols to be used on cameras".

Symbolism and literary uses

In modern mysticism, the infinity symbol has become identified with a variation of the ouroboros, an ancient image of a snake eating its own tail that has also come to symbolize the infinite, and the ouroboros is sometimes drawn in figure-eight form to reflect this identification—rather than in its more traditional circular form.

In the works of Vladimir Nabokov, including The Gift and Pale Fire, the figure-eight shape is used symbolically to refer to the Möbius strip and the infinite, as is the case in these books' descriptions of the shapes of bicycle tire tracks and of the outlines of half-remembered people. Nabokov's poem after which he entitled Pale Fire explicitly refers to "the miracle of the lemniscate". Other authors whose works use this shape with its symbolic meaning of the infinite include James Joyce, in Ulysses, and David Foster Wallace, in Infinite Jest.

Graphic design
The well-known shape and meaning of the infinity symbol have made it a common typographic element of graphic design. For instance, the Métis flag, used by the Canadian Métis people since the early 19th century, is based around this symbol. Different theories have been put forward for the meaning of the symbol on this flag, including the hope for an infinite future for Métis culture and its mix of European and First Nations traditions, but also evoking the geometric shapes of Métic dances,, Celtic knots, or Plains First Nations Sign Language.

A rainbow-coloured infinity symbol is also used by the neurodiversity movement, as a way to symbolize the infinite variation of the people in the movement and of human cognition. The Bakelite company took up this symbol in its corporate logo to refer to the wide range of varied applications of the synthetic material they produced. Versions of this symbol have been used in other trademarks, corporate logos, and emblems including those of Fujitsu, Cell Press, and the 2022 FIFA World Cup.

Encoding
An encircled version is encoded for use as a symbol for acid-free paper.

The Unicode set of symbols also includes several variant forms of the infinity symbol that are less frequently available in fonts in the block Miscellaneous Mathematical Symbols-B.

See also 

 Aleph number
 History of mathematical notation
 Lazy Eight (disambiguation)

References

Mathematical symbols
Infinity